The 2010 Canella Challenger was a professional tennis tournament played on outdoor red clay courts. It was part of the 2010 ATP Challenger Tour. It took place in Biella, Italy between May 10 and May 16, 2010. It returned for the first time since 2006.

Entrants

Seeds

 Rankings are as of May 3, 2010.

Other entrants
The following players received wildcards into the singles main draw:
  Paolo Lorenzi
  Enrico Fioravante
  Federico Gaio
  Stefano Napolitano

The following players received entry from the qualifying draw:
  Martín Alund
  Alberto Brizzi
  Sergio Gutiérrez-Ferrol
  Gianluca Naso

The following player received a lucky loser spot:
  Andrea Arnaboldi

Champions

Singles

 Björn Phau def.  Simone Bolelli, 6–4, 6–2

Doubles

 James Cerretani /  Adil Shamasdin def.  Dustin Brown /  Alessandro Motti, 6–3, 2–6, [11–9]

External links
Official website
ITF search 

Canella Challenger
Tennis tournaments in Italy